The Case of the Mukkinese Battle-Horn is a 30-minute comedy film  starring Peter Sellers, Spike Milligan and Dick Emery. The film was made in November 1955, and released in 1956.

Plot
Supposedly filmed in 'Schizophrenoscope' ("the New Split-Screen"), it concerns Superintendent Quilt of Scotland Yard's attempts to retrieve a 'Mukkinese Battle-Horn' stolen from a London museum. Along the way he meets characters not dissimilar to Eccles, Henry Crun and Minnie Bannister from The Goon Show.

Production
This attempt to adapt Goon humour to the big screen was written by Harry Booth, Jon Penington and regular Goon show co-writer Larry Stephens, from a story by Stephens, with additional material by Sellers and Milligan. Emery replaced Harry Secombe, who was too expensive for the film's low budget.

The budget of £4,500 was raised from Archway Film Distributors (£1,500); Peter Weingreen, who worked with Michael Deeley and Harry Booth on The Adventures of Robin Hood (£1,500); and Joseph Sterling, who wanted to direct (£1,500). Peter Sellers was paid £900.

Release
The film was unable to secure a release in the US but screened widely as a supporting short in British cinemas. Michael Deeley says it remains the most profitable film he was ever associated with, returning its cost ten times over.

Critical reception
The New York Times wrote "It is a good thing Mr. Sellers and his helpers didn't try to stretch it for longer than a half hour. But within that time and with reservations...it makes a lively little lark."

References

External links

 
Entire script for The Case of the Mukkinese Battle-Horn
The Goons films at The Goon Show website
The Goons films at The Telegoons website
Copy of script

1956 films
1950s crime comedy films
British black-and-white films
British crime comedy films
Works by Spike Milligan
1956 short films
British comedy short films
1956 comedy films
1950s English-language films
1950s British films